Dzielna  is a village in the administrative district of Gmina Ciasna, within Lubliniec County, Silesian Voivodeship, in southern Poland.

References

Dzielna